Bulanov is a Russian masculine surname, its feminine counterpart is Bulanova. It may refer to
Aleksandr Bulanov (born 1989), Russian shot putter
Igor Bulanov (born 1963), Russian footballer
Maria Bulanova (born 1998), Russian bowler
Tatiana Bulanova (born 1969), Russian singer
Vyacheslav Bulanov (born 1970), Russian ice hockey referee

Russian-language surnames